Intelligence, surveillance and reconnaissance may refer to:

Joint Functional Component Command for Intelligence, Surveillance and Reconnaissance, U.S.A.
Intelligence, surveillance, target acquisition, and reconnaissance (ISTAR)

See also
70th Intelligence, Surveillance and Reconnaissance Wing, USAF